Vauxhall is a constituency represented in the House of Commons by Florence Eshalomi of Labour Co-op since her election in 2019.

Boundaries

1950–1974: The Metropolitan Borough of Lambeth wards of Bishop's, Marsh, Oval, Prince's, and Vauxhall.

1974–1983: The London Borough of Lambeth wards of Bishop's, Oval, Prince's, Stockwell, and Vassall.

1983–1997: The London Borough of Lambeth wards of Bishop's, Clapham Town, Ferndale, Larkhall, Oval, Prince's, Stockwell, and Vassall.

1997–2010: The London Borough of Lambeth wards of Angell, Bishop's, Clapham Town, Ferndale, Larkhall, Oval, Prince's, Stockwell, and Vassall.

2010–present: The London Borough of Lambeth wards of Bishop's, Clapham Town, Ferndale, Larkhall, Oval, Prince's, Stockwell, and Vassall.

Vauxhall is wholly within the London Borough of Lambeth. The core of the constituency, unchanged from the former Lambeth North, is delimited by the River Thames to the west and north and the boundary with Southwark to the east.

Constituency profile

The seat includes all of Vauxhall, North Lambeth, Stockwell, Kennington and some of Brixton and north Clapham. Its landmarks include the London Eye, The Oval cricket ground, Royal Vauxhall Tavern, SIS building and the National Theatre. Among Britain's most ethnically diverse constituencies, Vauxhall has sizable Jamaican, Portuguese, Ghanaian and Ecuadorian communities.

At just over 6% of the population, Vauxhall (which is located in the London Borough of Lambeth) has the largest proportion of LGBT+ people in the country.

Political history

The area has consistently voted in parliamentary elections for Labour Members of Parliament since 1929, except in 1931. This includes the results of the former seat of Lambeth North, which had near-identical boundaries.

Since a 1989 by-election, the seat had been represented by Kate Hoey. Continuing a history as a safe seat for Labour, since her 1989 election, Hoey consistently achieved majorities of 9,100 to 20,200 votes. The 2015 result made the seat the 105th safest of Labour's 232 seats by percentage of majority.

Despite Hoey being a prominent campaigner for leaving the European Union, Vauxhall voted to remain in the EU by 77.6% in the national referendum on 23 June 2016. In the 2017 general election, this led to her seat being targeted by pro-Remain organisations and high-profile individuals seeking to oust her in favour of the pro-EU Liberal Democrat candidate. There had been a change.org petition calling for Hoey's deselection as the Labour candidate for the seat; however, due to party rules this was unsuccessful. While Hoey did significantly increase her majority in 2017 to the largest the seat had ever seen, the Liberal Democrat vote total more than trebled, and they moved back into second place having fallen to fourth behind the Conservatives and the Greens in 2015. In May 2018, Hoey's local party passed a vote of no confidence in her, vowing to deselect the MP as well. On 8 July 2019 Hoey announced that she would retire from the House of Commons, and would not seek re-election as a Labour candidate at the next general election.

Prominent frontbenchers
George Strauss was appointed Minister of Supply from 1947 to 1951 during the Attlee Ministry. Kate Hoey was Minister for Sport (1999–2001) during the Blair Ministry.

Local government results
The local government wards in the constituency are currently entirely represented by Labour on Lambeth London Borough Council.

A single Conservative councillor represented the Clapham Town ward from 2002 until losing their seat by sixty votes in the 2006 Council Elections.

Three Liberal Democrat councillors represented the Bishop's ward from 1990 to 2014; they subsequently lost the three ward seats to Labour, as did the sole Liberal Democrat councilors in the Oval and Vassall wards. They failed to gain them back in 2018.

At the 2018 council elections, Labour won all of the ward seats in the constituency. The Liberal Democrats finished second in the wards of Bishop's, Oval, Stockwell and Prince's. The Conservatives finished the runner up in Clapham Town and the Green Party in Vassall, Ferndale and Larkhall.

Members of Parliament

Elections

Elections in the 2010s

 

13.6% was the largest vote share increase in a Labour held seat for the Liberal Democrats at the 2017 general election. UKIP stood down their candidate in order to ensure Hoey was successfully re-elected.

Elections in the 2000s

Elections in the 1990s

Elections in the 1980s

Elections in the 1970s

Elections in the 1960s

Elections in the 1950s

See also 
List of parliamentary constituencies in London

Notes

References

External links 
Politics Resources (Election results from 1922 onwards)
Electoral Calculus (Election results from 1955 onwards)

Parliamentary constituencies in London
Politics of the London Borough of Lambeth
Constituencies of the Parliament of the United Kingdom established in 1950
Vauxhall